New York's 113th State Assembly district is one of the 150 districts in the New York State Assembly. It has been represented by Carrie Woerner since 2015.

Geography
District 113 contains portions of Saratoga and Washington counties. Following the 2021 redistricting cycle, a portion of Warren County was added.

Recent election results

2022

2020

2018

2016

2014

2012

References

113